Mount Nansen may refer to:

 Mount Nansen (Antarctica)
 Mount Fridtjof Nansen in Antarctica
 Mount Nansen (Yukon) in Yukon, Canada